The 1975–76 NBA season was the 30th season of the National Basketball Association. The season ended with the Boston Celtics winning the NBA Championship, beating the Phoenix Suns 4 games to 2 in the NBA Finals.

Notable occurrences
Larry O'Brien begins his tenure as the league's third commissioner.
The 1976 NBA All-Star Game was played at The Spectrum in Philadelphia, with the Eastern Conference beating the Western Conference 123–109. Dave Bing of the Washington Bullets wins the game's MVP award.
The Kansas City-Omaha Kings are renamed the Kansas City Kings as they settle into a permanent home in Kansas City, Missouri.
The New Orleans Jazz moved into the cavernous Louisiana Superdome after splitting their inaugural season between two inadequate facilities, the Loyola University Fieldhouse and New Orleans Municipal Auditorium. 
The Houston Rockets play their inaugural season in The Summit.
It was the final season for Don Nelson, Pat Riley and Jerry Sloan as players. Each would go on to coach more than 2,000 games in the NBA.
This was the final season before the NBA-ABA merger. In the 1976 offseason, four ABA teams joined the NBA: the Denver Nuggets, Indiana Pacers, San Antonio Spurs, and the reigning ABA champion New York Nets, who relocated to New Jersey.
Dick Bavetta began his Hall of Fame officiating career, replacing the retired Mendy Rudolph, who suffered a blood clot in his lung during a 1975 playoff game and became an analyst for CBS Sports. Bavetta went on to set the record for most games officiated with 2,635 by the time he retired in 2014.
Kareem Abdul-Jabbar was named the league's Most Valuable Player despite his team missing the playoffs. He remains the only league MVP to miss the playoffs. 
The NBA Finals were contested by the Boston Celtics and Phoenix Suns. Phoenix was making their first finals appearance; Boston was making their fourteenth.
Game 4 of the NBA Finals was first game ever played in the month of June.
Game 5 of the NBA Finals between the Celtics and the Suns went into triple-overtime before the Celtics prevailed 128–126. This was the first triple-overtime game in NBA finals history; the only triple-overtime finals game since occurred in 1993, in which the Phoenix Suns were again participating.

Final standings

By division

By conference

Notes
z, y – division champions
x – clinched playoff spot

Playoffs

Statistics leaders

NBA awards
Most Valuable Player: Kareem Abdul-Jabbar, Los Angeles Lakers
Rookie of the Year: Alvan Adams, Phoenix Suns
Coach of the Year: Bill Fitch, Cleveland Cavaliers

All-NBA First Team:
F – Rick Barry, Golden State Warriors
F – George McGinnis, Philadelphia 76ers
C – Kareem Abdul-Jabbar, Los Angeles Lakers
G – Nate Archibald, Kansas City Kings
G – Pete Maravich, New Orleans Jazz

All-NBA Second Team:
F – Elvin Hayes, Washington Bullets
F – John Havlicek, Boston Celtics
C – Dave Cowens, Boston Celtics
G – Randy Smith, Buffalo Braves
G – Phil Smith, Golden State Warriors

NBA All-Rookie Team:
Joe Meriweather, Houston Rockets
Alvan Adams, Phoenix Suns
Lionel Hollins, Portland Trail Blazers
John Shumate, Phoenix Suns/Buffalo Braves
Gus Williams, Golden State Warriors

NBA All-Defensive First Team:
Paul Silas, Boston Celtics
John Havlicek, Boston Celtics
Dave Cowens, Boston Celtics
Norm Van Lier, Chicago Bulls
Slick Watts, Seattle SuperSonics

NBA All-Defensive Second Team:
Jim Brewer, Cleveland Cavaliers
Jamaal Wilkes, Golden State Warriors
Kareem Abdul-Jabbar, Los Angeles Lakers
Jim Cleamons, Cleveland Cavaliers
Phil Smith, Golden State Warriors

See also
1976 NBA Finals
1976 NBA playoffs
1975–76 ABA season

References